Oshikango is a constituency in the town of Helao Nafidi in the Ohangwena Region of northern Namibia, on the border to Angola. It had 27,599 inhabitants in 2004 and 17,480 registered voters . It is named after the settlement of Oshikango, today part of the town Helao Nafidi.

Politics
As is common in all constituencies of former Owamboland, Namibia's ruling SWAPO Party has dominated elections since independence. 

The first councillor of Oshikango Constituency was SWAPO politician Michael Hishikushitja. He was elected to represent Ohangwena region in the National Council of Namibia and served in both positions until his death in 2001.

SWAPO also won the 2015 regional election by a landslide. Its candidate Fillippus Namundjebo gathered 6,023 votes, while the opposition candidates Timotheus Shikongo of the Rally for Democracy and Progress (RDP) and Gabriel Shikudule of the Democratic Turnhalle Alliance (DTA), received 451 and 172 votes, respectively. SWAPO also won the 2020 regional election. Its candidate Ester Nghidimbwa received 4,782 votes, far ahead of Timotheus Shikongo of the Independent Patriots for Change (IPC), an opposition party formed in August 2020, who obtained 980 votes.

References 

Helao Nafidi
Constituencies of Ohangwena Region
States and territories established in 1992
1992 establishments in Namibia